Ishmael Hyman  (born August 23, 1995) is an American football wide receiver for the Michigan Panthers of the United States Football League (USFL). He played college football at James Madison.

Early life and high school
Hyman grew up Manalapan, New Jersey and attended St. John Vianney High School, where he played football and ran track. As a senior, he had 24 receptions for 428 yards and four touchdowns before suffering a season-ending injury and finished fourth in the state in the 200-meter dash. Rated a three-star recruit, Hyman committed to play college football at Kansas over offers from Boston College, Rutgers, Syrcause, Temple, James Madison and Villanova.

College career
Hyman began his collegiate career at the University of Kansas, redshirting his true first year before deciding to transfer to James Madison University at the end of the season. In four seasons with the Dukes, Hyman caught 72 passes for 1,061 yards and 11 touchdowns and was a member of the 2016 team that won the FCS National Championship.

Professional career

Orlando Apollos
After going unselected in the 2018 NFL Draft and going unsigned as an undrafted free agent, Hyman was signed by the Orlando Apollos of the Alliance of American Football. Hyman caught four passes for 60 yards with Orlando before the AAF ceased operations.

Cleveland Browns
Hyman was signed by the Cleveland Browns on April 25, 2019. Hyman was waived by the Browns during final roster cuts on August 31, 2019.

Tampa Bay Buccaneers
Hyman was signed by the Tampa Bay Buccaneers' practice squad on September 24, 2019. He was released but was re-signed on October 16, 2019. The Buccaneers promoted Hyman to the active roster on December 10, 2019. He made his NFL debut on December 15, 2019, against the Detroit Lions, catching one pass for three yards in a 38–17 win. He was waived on December 24, 2019, and re-signed to the practice squad. Hyman finished the season with two receptions on four targets for 34 yards in two games played.

Carolina Panthers
On January 2, 2020, Hyman signed a reserve/future contract with the Carolina Panthers. He was waived on September 5, 2020, and signed to the practice squad the next day. He was placed on the practice squad/injured list on November 28. He was placed on the practice squad/COVID-19 list by the team on December 7, 2020, and moved back to the practice squad/injured list on December 22. He signed a reserve/future contract with the Panthers on January 4, 2021. He was waived on August 28, 2021.

Michigan Panthers
Hyman signed with the Michigan Panthers of the United States Football League (USFL) on May 10, 2022, and was transferred to the team's inactive roster two days later.

Green Bay Packers
On July 28, 2022, Hyman signed with the Green Bay Packers. He was waived/injured on August 30, 2022 and placed on injured reserve. He was released on September 9.

Michigan Panthers (second stint)
On January 19, 2023, Hyman signed with the Michigan Panthers of the United States Football League (USFL) for his second stint with the team.

References

External links
Green Bay Packers bio
James Madison Dukes bio
Tampa Bay Buccaneers bio

1995 births
Living people
People from Manalapan Township, New Jersey
Sportspeople from Monmouth County, New Jersey
St. John Vianney High School (New Jersey) alumni
Players of American football from New Jersey
American football wide receivers
Kansas Jayhawks football players
James Madison Dukes football players
Orlando Apollos players
Cleveland Browns players
Tampa Bay Buccaneers players
Carolina Panthers players
Michigan Panthers (2022) players
Green Bay Packers players